Pattalam is a 2009 Tamil language teen film directed by Rohan Krishna. Produced by Thirupathi Brothers company, the film features an ensemble cast including Nadhiya, Yuthan Balaji, Arun, Hariharan, Irfan, Deepthi Nambiar, and Vikash Suresh. The music was composed by Jassie Gift. The film was released on 27 March 2009 to mixed reviews.

The film is about a school correspondent and psychiatrist who is very close to eight school going youngsters who are having a blast enjoying their teenage years without any commitments to burden them.

Plot
The film is about two groups of four adolescents in Holy Bells School, who are pitted against each other. Their encounters make up the first part.

Daisy (Nadhiya) is the correspondent of the school. A psychologist too, she manages a mental asylum. She believes that students in her school can be disciplined only through love and no hard punishments will reform them. At first, two groups of students who are rivals are always seen fighting with each other. At an athletic competition, due to their enmity, they come last of all. At this time, a former professor of the school who was dismissed from the school due to his harsh punishments taunts Daisy, saying that only harsh punishments and scolding can make students disciplined. Seeing the taunts that Daisy is hearing due to them, the two rivals join together to make Daisy and the school proud of them.

On the other hand, Sakkarai (Arun) is secretly loving Sophia (Deepthi Nambiar), who is new to their school. She stays with him in Daisy's asylum. Meanwhile, Karthi (Irfan), who is one of the members of the rival gang, loses his father, due to which his mother deserts him. Therefore, he too joins Sakkarai and Sophia in the asylum. Karthi sees his dead sister in Sophia, and so he is very friendly with her. Thinking that Karthi and Sophia are in love each other, Sakkarai plans to kill Karthi by making a church bell fall on him. However, after knowing the truth, Sakkarai rushes to save Karthi, but unfortunately, Jerry (Yuthan Balaji) comes under the bell and dies. The incident makes Sakkarai mentally unfit. The film ends with Sakkarai hallucinating Jerry's presence.

Cast

 Nadhiya as Daisy
 Irfan as Karthi
 Yuthan Balaji as Jerry
 Kiruba as Sophia
 Arun as Sakkarai
 Deepthi Nambiar as Sophia
 Hariharan as Jagan
 Vikash Suresh as Nuttu
 Sathya as Guru
 Guru as Jilakhi
 Vignesh as Jilakhi's brother
 Pandu as Jilakhi's father

Production 
Initially, the film a father character in the lead. Jayaram was supposed to do the character but could not allocate dates for the film. N. Subash Chandrabose suggested that the character be changed to a female teacher. Nadhiya's voice was dubbed by Rohini.

Soundtrack 
The songs were composed by Jassie Gift.

Reception 
A critic from Rediff.com wrote that "Pattalam does give you a brief, 'in the school' feeling; pity that it's so short-lived". A critic from Sify wrote that "Debutant director Rohan Krishna?s back to school Pattalam with tag line 'relieve your school memories', is a clean movie that follows the classic Paneer Pushpangal format". A critic from The Times of India wrote that "This one is for the younger generation and is typical Kollywood fare". A critic from Behindwoods wrote that "Although the central knot of lending a long rope to youngsters for grooming them in the right direction is something zeitgeistical, the treatment sags and is short of verve".

References

External links
 

2009 films
2000s Tamil-language films
2000s teen drama films
Films set in schools
Indian coming-of-age drama films
Indian teen drama films
2009 directorial debut films
2000s coming-of-age drama films